Kleisoura ("enclosure" or "pass") may refer to:

Kleisoura (Byzantine district), a Byzantine military frontier province
Kleisoura, Kastoria, a village and a municipality in Kastoria regional unit, Greece
 Battle of Kleisoura Pass, April 1941
Kleisoura, Larissa, a village and a municipality in Larissa regional unit, Greece
Kleisoura, Preveza, a village in the municipal unit of Filippiada, Preveza regional unit, Greece
Kleisoura, the Greek name for Këlcyrë, a town and mountain pass in southern Albania
 Capture of Klisura Pass, January 1941

See also
 Klisura (disambiguation)